Ilkka Mäkelä (born 25 June 1963, in Elimäki) is a Finnish football manager, former player, and current manager of MyPa.

Coaching career
He was sacked after the 2010 season as FC Lahti were relegated to Ykkönen. On 20 December 2010 he signed a three-year contract with Finnish FA, taking the Finland's U15, U16 and U17 teams under his management.

On 19 November 2019 MyPa confirmed, that Mäkelä would return as the club's manager for the 2020 season.

References

External links
Veikkausliiga Hall of Fame

1963 births
Living people
Finnish footballers
Finnish football managers
Veikkausliiga players
Finnish expatriate footballers
Finland international footballers
FC Haka players
Rovaniemen Palloseura players
FC Lahti players
Myllykosken Pallo −47 players
Association football defenders
Myllykosken Pallo −47 managers
People from Elimäki
Sportspeople from Kymenlaakso